Andrew William George Carroll (19 July 1906 – 30 December 1970) was an Australian rules footballer who played for the Geelong Football Club in the Victorian Football League (VFL).

The son of Ada Jane Collins, Andrew William George Collins was born in Geelong on 19 July 1906. He later took the surname Carroll when his mother married William Henry Carroll.

Notes

External links 

1906 births
1970 deaths
Australian rules footballers from Victoria (Australia)
Geelong Football Club players